Devnarayan Kumar (born 25 December 1996) is an Indian cricketer. He made his List A debut for Tripura in the 2016–17 Vijay Hazare Trophy on 3 March 2017.

References

External links
 

1996 births
Living people
Indian cricketers
Tripura cricketers
Place of birth missing (living people)